Far from Home: The Adventures of Yellow Dog is a 1995 survival adventure film starring Jesse Bradford and directed by Phillip Borsos in his final directorial film. Its cumulative box office earnings were $11,642,946 according to Box Office Mojo.

Plot
Thirteen-year-old Angus McCormick (Jesse Bradford) lives near a small town in British Columbia with his parents and eight-year-old brother Silas. Nowadays, he either runs his paper route to earn his savings, learns wilderness survival skills from his father, or spends time with his friends David and Sara (Margot Finley). One afternoon, while gathering up firewood near the house, Angus finds a stray Yellow Labrador Retriever and begs his parents to let him keep him. Angus' parents, John and Katherine McCormick, agree that Angus can keep the stray on the condition that he takes full responsibility in taking care of the dog, who Angus names Yellow.

Several days later, while Angus, his father, and Yellow Dog are traveling along the coast of British Columbia, turbulent waters capsize their boat. John McCormick is rescued by helicopter and transported to a hospital for minor injuries, but Angus and Yellow soon find themselves stranded on the coast far from civilization. While Angus's parents relentlessly badger rescue teams, Angus, schooled by his father in wilderness survival skills, and assisted by the intelligent Yellow Dog, tries to attract rescuers.

Angus sets up a shelter on the rocky shores with his lifeboat and several branches before checking on the supplies he manages to retrieve from his father's capsized boat. The only supplies he has includes a box of matches, some fishing hooks and tackle, and a box of cookies that his girlfriend Sara had made for him. Angus catches a fish for supper and digs for clams on the shoreline with his dog Yellow. But after spending nine days on the shores without much luck attracting rescue teams and with little food left to sustain themselves, Angus realizes that he and Yellow must move on to reach civilization on their own. With the nearest lighthouse located about twenty miles south through the rugged wilderness of British Columbia, Angus decides to take the challenge and begins his journey across one of the largest wildernesses in the province.

While spending a cold, rainy night in a makeshift shelter, Angus and Yellow find themselves under attack by a pack of timber wolves. While Yellow chases off one wolf and engages in a fight with a second wolf, Angus finds himself confronted by a third wolf. He fends off the wolf for a moment before crawling away to safety, but the wolf turns and goes after Angus again. Before the wolf reaches Angus, Yellow appears and chases the wolf off. Yellow then leads a relieved Angus away to safety through the rainstorm.

Over the next several days, Angus struggles to find food to sustain himself and Yellow. In addition to the box of Sara's homemade cookies, Angus gathers grubs, berries, wild edible plants, and roots to eat. He even catches a small deer mouse in a makeshift trap and shares it with Yellow, but it's not enough to stave off their hunger. Besides starvation, other dangers test Angus' and Yellow's ability to survive in the wilderness. Rainstorms and cold temperatures tear at them day and night, forcing Angus to build a fire to keep himself and Yellow warm. One day, Angus slips and tumbles down a cliff, breaking his left wrist in the process. Later that same day, Angus finds himself at the edge of a large lake and spots the lighthouse positioned on a hill on the other side. He builds a raft out of branches, logs, and sticks, and with the aid of his dog is able to paddle across to the opposite shore.

Angus and Yellow eventually reach the lighthouse, but find it deserted and with no additional food or supplies to sustain them. Angus soon discovers a logging road running down the side of another hill several miles away and decides to head over there in the hopes of finding someone to help them. The following day, Yellow brings back a snowshoe hare to Angus, who kills it with a stick and cooks it for their supper. After a good meal and a rest, Angus and Yellow continue on their journey but find themselves looking down a narrow gorge with a running river below them. Angus finds a fallen tree across the top of the gorge and decides to cross it, but he and Yellow soon discover that the other side is blocked off by other fallen trees.

Just as Angus and Yellow begin to give up hope, a plane flies overhead and spots them on the tree. The pilot informs the rescue teams of his discovery, and a rescue helicopter is dispatched to pick up the boy and dog. Angus is relieved when the helicopter arrives to pick him and Yellow up. One of the search team members is lowered down and manages to grab hold of Angus, who tells him to get his dog. The man promises to return for the dog, but unbeknownst to him and Angus, Yellow attacks the man by biting down on his leg. As Angus and the man are lifted back up to the helicopter, Yellow is accidentally knocked off the tree and falls down the gorge into the river below. The team promises Angus that they will return for his dog, but with the winds picking up speed, the helicopter is forced to transport Angus over to a nearby hospital and leave Yellow behind. Yellow eventually survives the fall and manages to swim to shore with only an injured hind leg, but he is left behind to fend for himself.

Though Angus is happily reunited with his family, he is disappointed for leaving Yellow behind. The rescue teams spend the next few days searching for Yellow, but are unsuccessful in finding any trace of the dog. Because of budget issues caused by the three-week search, the search teams decide to call off the search. Angus blames himself for losing Yellow but refuses to give up hope that his dog is still alive. His family pitches in to help him find Yellow, putting up posters all over town and even searching different areas of the wilderness around their property for Yellow. One afternoon, while walking home from school, Angus' girlfriend Sara eventually cheers him up a little by kissing him. Later that day, Angus blows his dog whistle one last time and an exhausted Yellow appears in the middle of the field behind the house. He and his family all rejoice over the return of Yellow, who has finally returned home.

Cast

Critical response
The film received mixed reviews from critics with a 57% rating on review aggregator Rotten Tomatoes.

References

External links
 
 
 
 

1995 films
1990s coming-of-age films
20th Century Fox films
American children's adventure films
American coming-of-age films
American survival films
Canadian children's adventure films
Films about dogs
Films about families
Films directed by Phillip Borsos
Films about pets
Films scored by John Scott (composer)
Films set in forests
Films set in British Columbia
Films shot in British Columbia
Films about wolves
1990s English-language films
1990s American films
1990s Canadian films